The 1950 United States Senate election in Louisiana was held on November 7, 1950. Incumbent Democratic U.S. Senator Russell B. Long won re-election to a second term.

Democratic primary 
The Democratic primary was held on July 25, 1950.

Candidates 
Malcolm E. LaFargue, attorney, former U.S. district attorney
Russell B. Long, incumbent U.S. Senator
Newt V. Mills, real estate dealer, former U.S. Representative

Withdrew 
J. Y. Fauntleroy, member of the Louisiana State University Board of Supervisors

Results

General election

Results

See also 
 1950 United States Senate elections

References

Bibliography
 

1950
Louisiana
United States Senate